Mandi is a town and a tehsil in the Poonch district of the Indian union territory of Jammu and Kashmir. The Ancient Hindu temple Baba Budha Amernath is located here.

Demographics

The total projected population of Mandi Tehsil is 77,947, with 41,365 males and 36,582 females according to the 2011 census of India. The population includes  Gujjars, Bakerwals, Pahari-Pothwari Speakers, which is intermediate between Lahnda and Punjabi. and Kashmiris.

Transportation

Air
Poonch Airport is a non-operational airstrip in the district headquarters Poonch. The nearest airport to Mandi is Sheikh ul-Alam International Airport in Srinagar, located 180 kilometres from Mandi.

Rail
There is no railway connectivity to Mandi. There are plans to construct a Jammu–Poonch line which will connect Jammu with Poonch with railways. The nearest major railway station is Jammu Tawi railway station located 240 kilometres from Mandi.

Road
The tehsil is connected to other places in Jammu and Kashmir and India by the NH 144A and other intra-district roads.

See Also
Poonch
Jammu and Kashmir
Rajouri
Surankote
Jammu

References

Poonch district, India